Kevin Williamson (born 18 January 1959) is an Irish former swimmer. He competed at the 1976 Summer Olympics and the 1980 Summer Olympics.

References

External links
 

1959 births
Living people
Irish male swimmers
Olympic swimmers of Ireland
Swimmers at the 1976 Summer Olympics
Swimmers at the 1980 Summer Olympics
Place of birth missing (living people)
20th-century Irish people
21st-century Irish people